Arch of Caracalla may refer to:

Arch of Caracalla (Volubilis)
Arch of Caracalla (Thebeste)
Arch of Caracalla (Djémila)